Bính Bridge is a cable-stayed bridge across the Cấm River connecting the Hai Phong city with Thủy Nguyên District and out to Quảng Ninh.

History
Bính Bridge is a  modern cable-stayed bridge, some 1280 metres long and  22.5 metres wide carrying four lanes for traffic and two pedestrian lanes. The clearance below of  allow 3000-DWT ships can go through. The bridge has concrete steel beam instances, continuous 17 span, the 102 metre tall towers are made of reinforced concrete.

The bridge was constructed by a joint venture, consisting of Ishikawajima Harima Heavy Industries, Sumitomo Mitsui Construction and Shimizu Corporation, in 32 months. The owner of the bridge is the Project Management Office for Customs, under the leadership of the People's Committee of Hai Phong City.

Bính Bridge was built from Bính ferry 1300 m, to end the frequent traffic congestion and inconvenience to travel here by ferry. In addition, this bridge will help the development and formation of a new urban area of Hai Phong in the north area is prohibited. Along with the Kien bridge construction project on Highway 10, Bính Bridge played an important part in connection with the Quảng Ninh, Hai Phong, creating favorable conditions for the development of the transport network and the North economy of coastal areas in northern Vietnam.

Bính Bridge construction started on September 1, 2002 and ended May 13, 2005. Japanese government helped to construct the bridge VND 943 billion or 7426 million Yen at that time, including consulting services to supervise the construction. The projects are eligible for preferential loans of the Bank of Japan International Cooperation (JBIC).

Incident
On July 17, 2010 night, three large ships were moored at the wharf. Then the storm broke the cords, lead the vessels drift on the Cam River and then they had impact substantially on the Bính Bridge. Three vessels crashed into Bính Bridge include Shinsung Accord ship (Korean ship owner), tonnage 17,500 tons (the Corporation Bach Dang Shipbuilding Industry launched in mid-June), the two remaining ships was 1700 TEU Vinashin Express Transport Company 01 container ship from South China Sea Transport Company and the Vinashin Orient Corporation ship of Hai Duong Shipbuilding Industry which was being repaired here.

With scratched cables, the experts expect that if the cable is deformed, it takes about 6 months to replace the new cable.

External links
Binh Bridge at Structurae 
Cầu Bính 
Hải Phòng: "Xổng đà" ba tàu biển đâm hỏng cầu Bính 

Road bridges in Vietnam
Bridges completed in 2005
Maritime incidents in 2010
Cable-stayed bridges in Vietnam
Buildings and structures in Haiphong
Shimizu Corporation